Abryutinskie Vyselki is a rural locality (a village) in Yekimovskoye Rural Settlement of Ryazansky District, Ryazan Oblast, Russia. The population was 4 as of 2010.

Geography 
Abryutinskie Vyselki is located 19 km southwest of Ryazan (the district's administrative centre) by road. Abryutino is the nearest rural locality.

References 

Rural localities in Ryazan Oblast